Taray can refer to:
Taray District in Peru
Taray, Peru, the capital of Taray District
Cemal Hüsnü Taray (1893–1975), Turkish politician who was Minister of National Education of Turkey